Oskar Reinhart (11 June 1885 – 16 September 1965) was a Swiss arts patron and art collector, born in Winterthur. His collection now fills two museums, the Kunst Museum Winterthur | Reinhart am Stadtgarten in the centre of Winterthur, and the Oskar Reinhart Collection "am Roemerholz" at his former home, Am Römerholz, in Winterthur.

External links 
 Kunst Museum Winterthur | Reinhart am Stadtgarten, Winterthur
 Oskar Reinhart Collection 'Am Römerholz', Winterthur

1885 births
1965 deaths
Swiss art collectors
Swiss philanthropists
People from Winterthur